The Swedish Electricians' Union (SEF) is a trade union representing electricians in Sweden.

The union was founded in Stockholm in 1906, as a split from the Swedish Metalworkers' Union.  It initially had only 356 members, and this figure fluctuated until 1927, when it affiliated to the Swedish Trade Union Confederation.  Membership then grew to a peak of 29,170 in 1991, but has since fallen, being 18,770 in 2019.

The union represents electricians in light and heavy instillations, as well as radio, TV and electronics technicians and power station staff.

External links

References

Swedish Trade Union Confederation
Trade unions in Sweden
Trade unions established in 1906
1906 establishments in Sweden
Electricians' trade unions